The 349th Infantry Division was a German military unit which fought during World War II.

History 
The division was originally formed on 25 November 1943 in St. Omer near Calais, France, and fought mostly on the Eastern Front, being effectively destroyed near Zolochiv by the Soviet Army's Lvov-Sandomierz Offensive in July 1944, and disbanded in August 1944. Its commander was Infantry General Otto Lasch.

The division was reformed in September 1944 to the Volksgrenadier standard as 349th Volks-Grenadier-Division, commanded by Major-General Karl Koetz. During the East Prussian Offensive in January 1945, it was encircled in the Heiligenbeil pocket near Mehlsack and destroyed.

Source 
 Lexikon der Wehrmacht

Military units and formations established in 1943
Military units and formations disestablished in 1945
Infantry divisions of Germany during World War II